Michael Haydn's Symphony No. 35 in G major, Perger 27, Sherman 35, MH 474, written in Salzburg in 1788, is the last G major symphony he wrote, the second of his final set of six symphonies.

Scored for 2 oboes, 2 bassoons, 2 horns and strings, in three movements:

Allegro spiritoso
Andante, in D major with an episode in D minor
Presto

Discography

Like the other symphonies of the 1788 set of six, this one is in the CPO disc with Johannes Goritzki conducting the New German Chamber Academy.

References
 A. Delarte, "A Quick Overview Of The Instrumental Music Of Michael Haydn" Bob's Poetry Magazine November 2006: 29 PDF
 Charles H. Sherman and T. Donley Thomas, Johann Michael Haydn (1737 - 1806), a chronological thematic catalogue of his works. Stuyvesant, New York: Pendragon Press (1993)
 C. Sherman, "Johann Michael Haydn" in The Symphony: Salzburg, Part 2 London: Garland Publishing (1982): lxviii

Symphony 35
Compositions in G major
1788 compositions